Kakabe is a Mande language of Guinea.  The speakers of the Kakabe language reside in the Futa-Jallon plateau which is located in Guinea. Kakabe belongs to the Mokole group, which is the closest group to the Manding people in terms of culture and language. The language is spoken in a number of villages that are situated on the Futa-Jallon plateau in Guinea.

References

External links 
Audio and video resources in the Kakabe language by Alexandra Vydrina (site: Pangloss Collection)
ELAR archive of Description and Documentation of the Kakabe language by Alexandra Vydrina (site: ELAR)
 Kakabe DoReCo corpus compiled by Alexandra Vydrina. Audio recordings of narrative texts with transcriptions time-aligned at the phone level, translations, and time-aligned morphological annotations.

Mande languages
Languages of Guinea
Endangered languages of Africa